Legum is an English surname. Notable people with the surname include:

 Colin Legum (1919–2003), British anti-apartheid activist
 Judd Legum (born 1978), American journalist, lawyer, and political staffer
 Margaret Legum (1933–2007), British anti-apartheid activist

See also
 Legume

English-language surnames